Ferrier  may refer to:

People
 Ferrier (surname)

Places
 Ferrier Estate, q large council estate in Greenwich, London, UK
 Ferrier Peninsula, South Orkney Islands, Antarctica

Other
 Ferrier carbocyclization, an organic reaction
 Ferrier rearrangement, an organic reaction
 Kathleen Ferrier Award, a contest for opera singers

See also
 Ferrières (disambiguation), various meanings of a French name
 Farrier (disambiguation)
 Feria (disambiguation)